Olga Kypriotou (Mytilene, 1983) is a model and beauty pageant contestant. At the Miss Star Hellas 2004 pageant, she won the B Star Hellas title, where she went on to represent Greece at the Miss International pageant in 2004 in Beijing, China. She showed a strong standing in the event, placing as 2nd runner-up and winning the "Miss Photogenic" award. Aside from modeling and beauty pageants she has also done film and TV presentations.

External links
Image Management
Miss International 2004

Greek female models
Living people
1983 births
Miss International 2004 delegates
Greek beauty pageant winners

People from Mytilene